The 2017–18 season was Rotherham United's 93rd season in their existence and their first back in League One following relegation in 2016–17.  Along with competing in League One, the club also participated in the FA Cup, the EFL Cup and the EFL Trophy.

Key events
On 23 August 2017, Rotherham United were knocked out of the EFL Cup by Premier League side Huddersfield Town in the second round. Despite taking the lead in the first minute, they conceded two goals early in the second half, and saw a Kieffer Moore shot cleared off the line late in the game.

On 3 September 2017, the team won 1–0 against Portsmouth, who were managed by their former manager Kenny Jackett in a televised match at Fratton Park. This recorded Rotherham's first away league win in 27 matches, extending back to 9 April 2016.

On 4 November 2017, the team were knocked out of the FA Cup at EFL League Two side Crewe Alexandra, who scored a late goal to turn the tie around and win 2–1.

Despite playing their last game in the group stage of the competition on 7 November 2017, Rotherham had to wait three weeks to know their EFL Trophy fate. A draw between Chesterfield and Manchester City EDS on 29 November confirmed the clubs exit.

From 9 December 2017 to 24 February 2018, the team went 14 league games unbeaten, winning 11, including the last 7. The run was ended on 10 March 2018 with a 1–0 home defeat against Rochdale.

Having held 4th place in the league since mid-February, Rotherham confirmed a place in the play-offs on 21 April 2018, with a 2–0 win against Bristol Rovers.

Rotherham secured promotion back to the EFL Championship with a 2–1 extra time victory against Shrewsbury Town at Wembley Stadium on 27 May 2018.

Squad statistics

Player statistics
 
Players with zero appearances have been unused substitutes in one or more games.

Goalscorers

Pre-season friendlies
On 12 May 2017, Rotherham United announced they will host Sheffield United as part of their pre-season preparations. Four days later, the Millers added Parkgate friendly to the pre-season diary. On 17 May further friendlies at North Ferriby United and Chesterfield were confirmed. A fifth friendly, against Alfreton Town was revealed a day later. Two further friendlies, against Gainsborough Trinity and Barnsley were announced on 19 May.

The club announced a two-game training camp in Austria on 6 July 2017. The team will be based at the Sportschule Lindabrunn in Enzesfeld-Lindabrunn where they will face Hungarian side Soproni VSE. They will also play Floridsdorfer AC at the Austrian club's ground.

Competitions

League One

Results summary

Matchday summary

Matches

League One play-offs

FA Cup
On 16 October 2017, Rotherham United were drawn away to Crewe Alexandra in the first round.

EFL Cup
On 16 June 2017, Rotherham United were drawn at home to Lincoln City in the first round.

EFL Trophy

Transfers

Transfers in

Transfers out

Loans in

Loans out

References

Rotherham United
Rotherham United F.C. seasons